A Point of Law is a 2006 novel by John Maddox Roberts.  It is the tenth volume of Roberts's SPQR series, featuring Senator Decius Metellus.

Plot summary
Senator Decius Metellus has returned from his military expedition to Cyprus, having concluded a successful campaign against local pirates and gathered enough booty to pay off his outstanding debts and finance his campaign for praetor.  He is campaigning in the Forum when a young aristocrat loudly denounces him for alleged fraud and theft while in office on Cyprus, and boldly threatening to prosecute him for said acts.  A minor scuffle breaks out, before the young man is dragged away.

Later, the young man is found gruesomely murdered, and suspicion falls on Decius.  To his consternation, his family inform him that, although the charges are unlikely to stick, they can nevertheless delay his election for at least a year.  Decius, thinking hard, realizes that the young man may have been a virtual nobody, but could recite a pedigree that would virtually guarantee him popular support - claiming descent from Scipio Africanus and the Gracchi, among others.  This means that the young man was likely the figurehead of a conspiracy.  The exact aim of the conspiracy is unclear, but Decius reasons that someone must be aiming at reducing the Caecilia Metelli's voting bloc in the Senate (as Decius concedes, he himself is not that important).

Decius consults Sallustius, who gives him a small lecture about the Republic's political landscape: for generations, the great aristocratic families of Rome have been slowly shrinking, more dependent on adoption to sustain their numbers, and gradually losing their hold on the highest offices of state which they consider to be their birthright.  Now, with Caesar's power, wealth, and popularity growing on a daily basis, these aristocrats are being pushed to increasingly desperate lengths.  Sallust confides that he was a guest at several dinner parties at which schemes were discussed to seize control of the State; the young man was to have been the figurehead, and popular support was supposed to have been further mobilized by proposing a mass cancellation of debts.  Of course, Sallust dismissed the scheme as hare-brained.

Characters in A Point of Law
Decius Metellus the Younger protagonist;
Hermes Decius's freedman and assistant;
Julia Decius's wife, Julius Caesar's niece;
Asklepeiodes Greek physician, Decius's close friend;
Callista Greek scholar living in Rome;

Historical characters
Octavia the Younger;
Gaius Sallustius Crispus;
Marcus Claudius Marcellus;
Gaius Claudius Marcellus (consul 49 BC);
Gaius Claudius Marcellus (consul 50 BC);
Gaius Scribonius Curio;
Fulvia;
Cicero;
Cato the Younger;
Julius Caesar (mentioned only);
Pompey (mentioned only);
Octavius (mentioned only);

2002 American novels
Novels set in ancient Rome
Cultural depictions of Cicero
Cultural depictions of Cato the Younger